The Innovation, Development and Employment Alliance is a business coalition launched in May 2009, aimed at securing intellectual property rights in a number of areas, including environmentally sound technology, healthcare and renewable energy. It is supported by the United States Chamber of Commerce; members include General Electric, Microsoft and Sunrise Solar. It was created in response to developments at the United Nations post–Kyoto Protocol negotiations on greenhouse gas emissions, where developing countries such as Brazil, India and China want the ability to compulsory licence green technology, as they are currently able to do with key drugs, notably for AIDS treatment.

References

External links
 ideasforinnovation.org
 greenpatentblog.com

Organizations established in 2009